Indian cinematographers work in a number of regional film centres: Chennai for Tamil films, Mumbai for films in Marathi and Hindi, Hyderabad for films in Telugu, Kochi for films in Malayalam, Kolkata for Bengali films, Bangalore for Kannada films, etc. Most Indian cinematographers are known for their work with one regional industry. Some cinematographers belong to various professional organisations and trade unions.

Western India Cinematographers' Association (WICA)

The Western India Cinematographers Association (WICA) is a society for Indian cinematographers. The society is situated at Mumbai in Maharashtra. Members of this society include the suffix WICA after their name in film credits. The organisation was formed on 2 August 1953 in Mumbai, and was presided over by a leading cinematographer of the time, Faredoon Irani; in the following month the first office bearers were chosen, including Nitin Bose as President and V. Avadhut as the Vice-President. According to WICA, there are 3800 members of the organisation.

Southern India Cinematographers Association (SICA)
The Southern India Cinematographers Association (SICA), a trade union, was founded on 27 November 1972 by A. Vincent.

The Indian Society of Cinematographers
The Indian Society of Cinematographers (ISC) is an educational, cultural, and professional organization founded in 1995. Neither a labor union nor a guild, ISC membership is by invitation and is extended only to directors of photography and special effects experts with distinguished credits in the film industry. The society is situated at Thiruvananthapuram in Kerala. The members of this society will show a suffix, ISC with their name in film credits. Sunny Joseph is the current president of the ISC.

Founding members 

Anil Mehta
Ramachandra Babu
Sunny Joseph
P. C. Sreeram
Santosh Sivan
K. V. Anand
Venu
Ravi K. Chandran
Madhu Ambat
P. Sukumar

Members of ISC 

Anil Mehta
Amal Neerad
Alagappan N. 
C. K. Muraleedharan
Chezhiyan
Chota K. Naidu
Fowzia Fathima
Gireesh Gangadharan
Hari Nair
K. V. Anand
K. G. Jayan
K. U. Mohanan
Jomon T. John
Akshit Rohda
Lalit Rohda
Madhu Ambat
R.Madhi
Madhu Neelakandan
Natarajan Subramaniam
Preetha Jayaraman
P. C. Sreeram
P. S. Vinod
Rajeev Ravi
Ramachandra Babu
Ravi K. Chandran
Ravi Varman
Sameer Thahir
Santosh Sivan
Sathyan Sooryan
Shaji N. Karun
Shyju Khalid
Sunny Joseph
Venu
S. R. Kathir

List of Indian cinematographers

 Lalit Rohda
 Abinandhan Ramanujam
 Arjun Jena
 A. Vincent
 Alagappan N.
 A. Vinod Bharathi
 Abhik Mukhopadhyay
 Ancer Thwayyib
 Anil Mehta
 Aravinnd Singh
 Arbhindu Saaraa
 Amal Neerad
 Akshit Rohda
 Adurthi Subba Rao (1912-1975)
 Ajayan Vincent
 Arthur A. Wilson
 Arvind Krishna
 Aseem Mishra
 Ashok Kumar
 Ashok Mehta (1947-  2012),
 Baba Azmi
 Balu Mahendra
 Barun Mukherjee
 Binod Pradhan
 B. Kannan (1951-2020)
 Chota K. Naidu
 C. K. Muraleedharan
 Debu Deodhar (1948 - 2010)
 Deepak Haldankar (born 1947)
 Dev Agarwal
 Dilip Dutta
 Fali Mistry (1919 - 1979)
 Gavemic U. Ary
 George C. Williams
 Girish Gangadharan
 Govind Nihalani
 Hari Nair
 Jaya Krishna Gummadi
 Jayanan Vincent
 Jeeva (1963 - 2007)
 Jomon T. John
 K V Anand (1966-2021)
 K. U. Mohanan
 K. K. Mahajan (1944 – 2007)
 K.K. Senthil Kumar
 K. V. Guhan
 Kamal Bose (1915 - 1995)
 M J Radhakrishnan(1958 - 2019
 Madhu Ambat
 Madhu Neelakandan
 Mahesh Muthuswami
 Manoj Paramahamsa
 Marcus Bartley
 Nirav Shah
 N. K. Ekambaram
 Natarajan Subramaniam
 Om Prakash
 Pappu (cinematographer)
 P. S. Nivas
 P. C. Sreeram
 P.G. Vinda
 P. S. Vinod
 Padmesh
 Prasad Murella
 Pratap P Nair
 R. D. Rajasekhar
 R. Rathnavelu
 R. Madhi
 R. Velappan Nair
 Rajeev Ravi
 Rajesh Yadav
 Rajiv Menon
 Ramachandra Babu
 Ramananda Sengupta
 Ramji
 Rasool Ellore
 Ravi K. Chandran
 S. Kumar
 S. Ravi Varman
 S. R. Kathir
 S. Gopal Reddy
 Samalabhasker
 Sameer Reddy
 Sameer Thahir
 Sanu Varghese
 Santosh Sivan
 Santosh Thundiyil
 Sathyan Sooryan
 Satish Motling
 Satheesh Kurup
 Sejal Shah
 Shaji Kumar
 Shaji N. Karun
 Shehnad Jalal
 Shyam K. Naidu
 Shyju Khalid
 Sivakumar Vijayan
 Subrata Mitra
 Sudeep Chatterjee
 Supratim Bhol
 Sudhakar Reddy Yakkanti
 Subhankar Bhar
 Sujith Vaassudev
 Sunny Joseph 
 Theni Eswar
 T. Surendra Reddy
 Teja
 Tirru
 V. N. Reddy (1914 - 1991)
 V. Gopi Krishna
 V. Manikandan
 Venu
 Velraj
 Vijay Milton
 Vijay C Chakravarthy
 Vijay C. Kumar
 Vierendrra Lalit
 Vishal Sinha
 Vishnu Rao
 Vishnu Sarma

Awards
 Filmfare Award for Best Cinematographer
 Filmfare Best Cinematographer Award (South)
SIIMA Award for Best Cinematographer (Telugu)
 IIFA Award for Best Cinematography
Nandi Award for Best Cinematographer
 Kerala State Film Award for Best Photography
 National Film Award for Best Cinematography
 National Film Award for Best Non-Feature Film Cinematography
 Star Screen Awards
 Tamil Nadu State Film Award for Best Cinematographer

See also
Cinema of India
Cinema of South India
Indian film directors

References

External links
 Official Website of WICA
 Official Website of ISC
 Official Website of SICA

 
C